This is a list of releases by Cuneiform Records.

Catalog

Archival releases
Note: The first few reissues came out as "Wayside Music Archive Series" releases

Samplers

Artists
Artists who have released albums or reissues on the label:

 Rez Abbasi
 Accordo dei Contrari
 Afuche
 Morgan Ågren
 Ahleuchatistas
 Ahvak
 Arkham
 Jonathan Badger
 Beat Circus
 Bent Knee
 Rick Biddulph
 Birdsongs Of The Mesozoic
 Raoul Björkenheim
 Blast
 Blixt (Bill Laswell, Raoul Björkenheim, Morgan Ågren)
 Blue Cranes
 Bone
 Boom
 David Borden / Mother Mallard's Portable Masterpiece Company
 Boud Deun
 Chris McGregor's Brotherhood of Breath
 Bubblemath
 Cartoon (Scott Brazieal, Herb Diamant, Craig Fry, Mark Innocenti, Gary Parra) 
 George Cartwright
 The Cellar and Point
 Chainsaw Jazz
 Cheer-Accident
 Guigou Chenevier
 Chrome Hoof
 The Claudia Quintet
 Graham Collier
 Cosmologic
 Robert Creeley
 Curlew
 The Danubians
 Carlo De Rosa's Cross-Fade
 Dead Cat Bounce
 Elton Dean
 Delivery
 Daniel Denis
 Deus ex Machina
 Djam Karet
 Doctor Nerve
 Paul Dunmall Octet
 Empirical
 Ergo
 Exploding Star Orchestra
 Forrest Fang
 Far Corner
 Fast 'N' Bulbous
 Forever Einstein
 Forgas Band Phenomena
 Michael Formanek
 Fred Frith / Henry Kaiser
 Peter Frohmader
 Ghost Rhythms
 Michael Gibbs
 Gilgamesh
 The Great Harry Hillman
 Grits
 Gösta Berlings Saga
 Guapo
 Gutbucket
 Mary Halvorson
 Hamster Theatre
 Happy Family
 Happy the Man
 Joel Harrison
 Curtis Hasselbring
 Healing Force
 Heldon
 Lars Hollmer
 Hugh Hopper
 The Hosemobile
 Hughscore
 Ideal Bread
 I.P.A.
 Harry Miller 's Isipingo
 Isotope
 Janel and Anthony
 Richard Leo Johnson
 Henry Kaiser
 Dave Kerman / 5uu's
 The Kandinsky Effect
 Kombinat M
 Krakatoa
 Steve Lacy - Roswell Rudd Quartet
 Bill Brovold's Larval
 Bill Laswell
 Le Rex
 Led Bib
 Living By Lanterns (co-led by Jason Adasiewicz and Mike Reed)
 Gary Lucas' Fleischerei, featuring Sarah Stiles
 Machine and the Synergetic Nuts
 The Mahavishnu Project
 Christian Marclay / Toshio Kajiwara / DJ Olive: djTRIO
 Rob Mazurek
 Matching Mole
 Mats/Morgan Band
 The Microscopic Septet
 Piero Milesi
 Phil Miller / In Cahoots
 Steve Miller / Lol Coxhill
 Miriodor
 Steve Moore
 Virgil Moorefield
 Motor Totemist Guild
 The Muffins
 Mujician
 Naima
 National Health
 NDIO
 NeBeLNeST
 No Safety
 Nucleus
 Mike Osborne
 Otolithen
 Ed Palermo Big Band
 PFS (Scott Brazieal, Herb Diamant, Craig Fry, Bill Johnston, Gary Parra)
 Philharmonie
 Picchio dal Pozzo
 Richard Pinhas
 Anthony Pirog
 Pixel
 Planeta Imaginario
 Positive Catastrophe
 Present
 Proto-Kaw
 Pip Pyle's Bash!
 Radio Massacre International
 Rattlemouth
 Alec K. Redfearn & The Eyesores
 Revolutionary Snake Ensemble
 Jason Robinson
 Adam Rudolph / Go: Organic Guitar Orchestra
 Ray Russell
 Dylan Ryan / Sand
 São Paulo Underground
 Schnellertollermeier
 Siamese Stepbrothers
 Wadada Leo Smith
 Soft Machine
 SONAR
 S.O.S. (Alan Skidmore, Mike Osborne, John Surman)
 Sotos
 Stick Men
 John Surman
 Tatvamasi
 Thinking Plague
 Thumbscrew: Mary Halvorson, Michael Formanek, Tomas Fujiwara
 Steve Tibbetts
 Time of Orchids
 Le Tout Sur Le Tout
 U Totem
 Univers Zero
 University of Errors
 Upsilon Acrux
 Uz Jsme Doma
 Volapük
 Von Zamla
 C. W. Vrtacek
 Gary Windo
 Rich Woodson's Ellipsis
 Robert Wyatt
 Yang
 Zaar

References

Discographies of American record labels